This is a list of cities and towns in the Limpopo province of South Africa. Since 2003, a number of cities and towns have changed their names and may yet to be widely accepted and some of these place names remain the same as previously.

A

B

D

E

G

H

K

L

M

N

O

P

R

S

T

V

Z

All 

Mashashane

Limpopo